Morum concilium is a species of sea snail, a marine gastropod mollusk, in the family Harpidae.

Distribution
This species occurs in Mozambique.

References

concilium
Gastropods described in 2018